Spike Island is a 2012 British comedy film directed by Mat Whitecross and written by Chris Coghill. It was distributed by Universal Pictures and Vertigo Films and produced by Revolver Entertainment. The film is based on The Stone Roses' seminal gig on Spike Island in Widnes, Cheshire, England, and follows the story of a group of friends who idolise the band and try to get into the gig, but are faced with problems because they do not have a ticket or a way to get there. Spike Island premiered on 11 October 2012 at the BFI London Film Festival and was released on DVD on 21 June 2013.

Plot
Set in May 1990, the film follows the exploits of five lads: Gary 'Tits' Titchfield, Darren 'Dodge' Hodge, Chris 'Zippy' Weeks, 'Little Gaz' Gareth Barrett and 'Penfold' Andrew Peach. They are fans of The Stone Roses and members of wannabe band Shadowcaster. It starts 60 hours prior to The Stone Roses' legendary gig at Spike Island, Widnes, Cheshire. The group get an idea to give The Stone Roses their cassette tape via Sally, a girl whom both Tits and Dodge show interest in, although Dodge has never spoken to her. They hatch a plan to get tickets to the gig and kick-start their career. Tits' brother 'Ibiza' Steve gets the boys on the guest-list for the gig. But when Tits' dad becomes increasingly ill during the 60 hours, he fails to turn up and on the morning of the gig his dad worsens but his dad tells Tits to go to the gig. Penfold's dad burns his top in an effort to stop him from going and when he goes to hit him Penfold stands up to his dad after his dad has been abusing him and heads to the gig. They lure 'Uncle Hairy' out of his van and steal it but when they run out of fuel they have to stop but Penfold convinces them to walk to the M6. They hide in the baggage hold of the bus until they arrive at Spike Island. Once arrived they jump out of their hiding place and are chased by police and the bus driver but lose them in the crowd. They lose Penfold and are unable to find him, so they carry on to the entry zone but are turned away because they do not have tickets and are not on the guest-list. The remaining four make their way to the outside of the venue. They meet Sally who has lost her friends in the crowd and doesn't want to go in alone and gives Dodge her ticket. Dodge heads for the gig without the cassette tape because he was afraid "to fuck it up". On his way back to the boys, he sees Sally and Tits hooking up. Tits and Dodge later argue but when Tits' dad eventually dies they make up. Meanwhile, Zippy visits the nearby Catalyst Science Discovery Centre (at that point still called The Museum of the Chemical Industry). At the end of the movie it is shown that Tits and Sally are together and all the boys have moved on as school has finished. The ending scene shows Tits looking at Dodge from his window while Dodge walks down the lane with his guitar and bags.

Cast
 Elliott Tittensor as Gary Tits Titchfield 
 Emilia Clarke as Sally "Cinnamon" Harris 
 Lesley Manville as Margaret Titchfield 
 Nico Mirallegro as Dodge
 Jordan Murphy as Zippy
 Adam Long as Little Gaz
 Oliver Heald as Penfold
 Chris Coghill as Uncle Hairy
 Matthew McNulty as Ibiza Steve  Titchfield 
 Nick Blood as Dave Famous
 Michael Socha as Carl
 Antonia Thomas as Lisa
 Jodie Whittaker as Suzanne
 Paul Popplewell as 'Roses Manager
 Andrew Knott as Voodoo Ray
 Rob James-Collier as Mr Milligan
 Philip Jackson as Mr Jackson
 Steve Evets as Eric Titchfield

Reception

Critical response
On Rotten Tomatoes, the film has a rating of 48% based on 25 reviews; the average rating is 4.9/10. The 'Critics Consensus' on its Rotten Tomatoes page says: "Spike Island has energy and visual style to spare; unfortunately, they're lost within the movie's clichéd story and choppy direction."

Awards
 Elliot Tittensor was nominated for Most Promising Newcomer for the 2012 British Independent Film Awards.

References

External links
 

The Stone Roses
2012 films
British drama films
2012 drama films
Films directed by Mat Whitecross
Films scored by Ilan Eshkeri
Films set on islands
Vertigo Films films
BBC Film films
Universal Pictures films
Films shot in Greater Manchester
2010s English-language films
2010s British films